Roman Anatolyevich Silantyev is a Russian sociologist Islamic expert, former executive secretary of the Interreligious Council of Russia (IIRC), director of the human rights center of the World Russian People's Council, a staff member of the Moscow Patriarchate Department for External Church Relations.

In 2005 Silantyev was relieved from his IIRC posts after the controversial reception of his book A Modern History of the Islamic Community in Russia, criticized both from the Muslim and Eastern Orthodox sides.

In 2007 Silantyev published another book A Modern History of Islam in Russia.

In 2008 Silantyev published Islam in Russia Today.

References

Russian sociologists
Scholars of Islam
Living people
Year of birth missing (living people)
Moscow State University alumni